Green Birdie (foaled 31 October 2003) is a Hong Kong-based Thoroughbred racehorse.

In the season of 2009–2010, he won the G1 KrisFlyer International Sprint at Kranji on 16 May. He was also one of the nominees for the 2010 Hong Kong Horse of the Year.

References

External links
 The Hong Kong Jockey Club – Green Birdie Racing Record
 

Racehorses trained in Hong Kong
Racehorses bred in New Zealand
Hong Kong racehorses
2003 racehorse births
Thoroughbred family 21-a